The National Museum of the Islamic Revolution and Holy Defense (Muze-ye Melli-e enghelab-e eslami ve defa'-e moghadas), located in Tehran on a landscaped site of 21 hectares, is one of the largest museums of Iran. It is dedicated to the Iran–Iraq War (1980–1988), the conflict known in Iran as "imposed war" or mainly "Holy Defense". The museum consists of different parts such as Tomb of the Unknown Soldiers, flag tower, open area and lake, parking, conference halls, Khorramshahr Mosque, Library and Panorama museum. The main building of museum consists of 8 halls; each displays a specific concept of war  through many monitors, video projectors, hologram showcases and some other modern technologies.

References

Further reading

External links
  

Museums in Tehran
Architecture in Iran
Military and war museums
Tank museums